"Bits and Pieces" is a song by British beat group The Dave Clark Five. The single hit number 2 in the UK and number 4 in the US, as well as being a success in other countries. It was number 2 or 4 in Australia, number 1 in Canada and Ireland, and number 4 in the Netherlands. In Germany, it reached number 20.

Lead vocals are sung by Mike Smith, who also co-wrote the song.  "Bits and Pieces" is one of several Dave Clark Five songs written by Ron Ryan, rather than by Clark.

The song is in antiphonal style, with Mike Smith singing a solo line and the whole group responding. The drums have a very prominent part in the accompaniment. Additionally, some of the song's unique percussion was supplied by an exercise board, which two of the band members (reportedly quite intoxicated) stamped on, not always perfectly in time to the music.

Robert Christgau, writing in 1969, called the song "a wonderfully serviceable rock throwaway, raucous and meaningless, perfect for shouting into the night."  Cash Box described it as "a hard-hitting rocker that the boys pound out in a steady, heavy beat style."

The song's distinct stomp-like pattern has been sampled by numerous musicians.

The Dave Clark Five performed "Bits and Pieces" in an appearance on the Ed Sullivan Show.

References

1964 songs
1964 singles
Songs written by Mike Smith (Dave Clark Five)
Songs written by Dave Clark (musician)
The Dave Clark Five songs
RPM Top Singles number-one singles
Irish Singles Chart number-one singles
Columbia Graphophone Company singles
Epic Records singles
Capitol Records singles